Pissuthnes, also known as Pissouthnes, was an Achaemenid satrap of Lydia, which included Ionia, circa 440–415 BCE. His capital was Sardis. He was the son of Hystaspes, probably himself the son of Darius I, which shows his Persian origin and his membership of the Achaemenid dynasty. He held the satrapy for over twenty years, and became extremely rich as a consequence.

He helped the Samians in the Samian Revolt against Athens, and supported various oligarchical movements against Athens along the coast of Asia Minor.

He revolted against the Persian king Darius II Nothus between 420-415 BCE.  He recruited Greek mercenaries under the generalship of Lycon for his campaigns. Tissaphernes, who was sent by the King to suppress the revolt of Pissuthnes, managed to bribe Lycon, and then brought Pissuthnes to Susa where he was executed. Tissaphernes became his successor as Satrap of Lydia.

Pissuthnes had a natural son named Amorges, who continued the rebellion against the Persian king.

References

External links
 Pissuthnes, Livius

Achaemenid satraps of Lydia
Military leaders of the Achaemenid Empire
5th-century BC Iranian people
Achaemenid satraps of Caria
Achaemenid satraps of Ionia
Achaemenid dynasty